Toula ou Le génie des eaux is a 1973 drama film directed by Moustapha Alassane.

Synopsis
The gods have cursed the country with a drought. There seems to be no hope. A holy man summoned by the king demands the sacrifice of a young woman to appease to the gods. Toula is chosen to be sacrificed. A young man in love who is in love with Toula goes in search of water to save his beloved from her fate, but when he returns with good news, he finds that he is too late: Toula has already disappeared in the holy swamp and the gods have been thus appeased.

Moustapha Alassane tackles the issue of the drought in Niger through a traditional story. The film was forbidden for some time in Niger.

Based on a Boubou Hama novel.

Festivals
Semaine de la solidarieté international, France (2011)
15th Film Festival of Kerala, India (2010)
Paris Cinéma, France (2005)
FCAT - Festival de Cine Africano, Spain (2005)

Awards
 Sidney Award's, 1st American Black Film Festival, U.S.A. (1977)

Bibliography
 Cinémas d'Afrique, Éditions Khartala, 2000, p. 32

References

External links
Toula ou Le génie des eaux in IMDb 
Toula ou Le génie des eaux in Film Affinity
Article (in French) in Africiné
 Moustapha Alassane 
 

1973 films
1973 drama films
Nigerien drama films
1970s French-language films